Çelikli can refer to:

 Çelikli, Karayazı
 Çelikli, Sur